Jeff Woodland (born 28 February 1957) is an Australian professional golfer who played on the PGA Tour and PGA Tour of Australasia.

Professional career 
Woodland joined the Ben Hogan Tour in 1991 and had a very successful rookie year, winning the Ben Hogan Dakota Dunes Open while recording nine top-10 finishes. The following year he won two tournaments, the Ben Hogan Wichita Charity Classic and the Ben Hogan Utah Classic while recording nine top-10 finishes en route to a 6th-place finishes on the money list, good enough to earn his PGA Tour card. He struggled in his rookie year on Tour but retained his card through qualifying school. He recorded his best finish on the PGA Tour in 1994 at the GTE Byron Nelson Golf Classic when he finished in a tie for eighth. He split time between the PGA and Nationwide Tour in 1995.

Professional wins (5)

Ben Hogan Tour wins (3)

Ben Hogan Tour playoff record (1–0)

Other wins (2)
1988 Fiji Open
1989 Jack Newton Celebrity Classic (tie with Mike Colandro)

Playoff record
PGA Tour of Australasia playoff record (0–1)

Results in major championships

Note: Woodland only played in The Open Championship.
CUT = missed the half-way cut
"T" = tied

See also
1992 Ben Hogan Tour graduates
1993 PGA Tour Qualifying School graduates

References

External links

Australian male golfers
PGA Tour golfers
Korn Ferry Tour graduates
People from Southern Region (Papua New Guinea)
1957 births
Living people